Leonardo "Leo" Martín Gutiérrez (born May 16, 1978) is an Argentine former professional basketball coach and former player. He played as a power forward.

Professional career
Gutiérrez had a career average of 13.1 points per game in the top-tier level Liga Nacional de Básquetbol, while playing in 1,106 games over 23 seasons. He scored a total of 14,531 points in the Argentina top League. He is also first all-time in games played in the Argentine League, and third all-time in total points scored.

He holds the record for Liga Nacional de Básquet as defending the most Argentine League championships won, at 10.

National team career
Gutiérrez defended Argentina, bringing home from FIBA Americas Championships: a gold medal in 2001 and 2011, silver medals at the 2002, 2003, 2005 and 2007, and a bronze medal in 2009.

He defended Argentina in Summer Olympic Games bringing home medals in 2004, and a bronze medal at the 2008.

Personal life
Gutiérrez met his wife at Venado Tuerto, while playing for Olimpia. He married his longtime fiancée on June 17, 2006. They have two children. The first child in 1999, and his daughter, Mora, in 2009.

Awards and accomplishments

Pro career
2× FIBA South American League Champion: (1996, 2006)
10× Argentine League Champion: (1996, 1999, 2002, 2005, 2007, 2009, 2010, 2011, 2012, 2014)
Argentine League Dunk Tournament Champion: (1998)
13× Argentine League All-Star Game: (2000, 2001, 2002, 2004, 2005, 2006, 2007, 2008, 2009, 2010, 2011, 2012, 2013)
4× Argentine League MVP: (2005, 2006, 2008, 2010)
6× Argentine League Ideal Quintet Team: (2005, 2006, 2008, 2010, 2012, 2014)
4× Argentine League Finals MVP: (2005, 2007, 2010, 2011)
3× Argentine Cup Winner: (2006, 2008, 2010)
Argentine All-Star Game MVP: (2006)
South American Club Championship Champion: (2006)
FIBA South American League MVP: (2006)
Argentine League Top Scorer: (2008)
3× Super 8 Tournament Winner: (2009, 2011, 2013)
Super 8 Tournament Top Scorer: (2009)
Super 8 Tournament MVP: (2009)
Konex Award Merit Diploma - One of five best basketball player from last decade in Argentina: (2010)
2× InterLeagues Tournament Champion: (2010, 2012)
InterLeagues MVP: (2010)
FIBA Americas League Champion: (2010)
Argentine League Triples Tournament Champion: (2012)

Argentina national team
2001 FIBA South American Championship: 
2001 FIBA Americas Championship: 
2002 FIBA World Championship: 
2003 FIBA South American Championship: 
2003 FIBA Americas Championship: 
2004 FIBA South American Championship: 
2004 Summer Olympic Games: 
2005 Stanković Continental Champions' Cup: 
2005 FIBA Americas Championship: 
2006 FIBA South American Championship: 
2007 FIBA Americas Championship: 
2008 FIBA Diamond Ball Tournament: 
2008 Summer Olympic Games: 
2009 FIBA Americas Championship: 
2011 FIBA Americas Championship: 
2012 FIBA South American Championship:

References

External links
FIBA Profile
Latinbasket.com Profile

1978 births
Living people
Argentine men's basketball players
Atenas basketball players
Basketball players at the 1999 Pan American Games
Basketball players at the 2004 Summer Olympics
Basketball players at the 2008 Summer Olympics
Basketball players at the 2012 Summer Olympics
Ben Hur basketball players
Boca Juniors basketball players
CB Inca players
Medalists at the 2004 Summer Olympics
Medalists at the 2008 Summer Olympics
Obras Sanitarias basketball players
Olimpia de Venado Tuerto basketball players
Olympic basketball players of Argentina
Olympic bronze medalists for Argentina
Olympic gold medalists for Argentina
Olympic medalists in basketball
Peñarol de Mar del Plata basketball players
Power forwards (basketball)
Small forwards
2014 FIBA Basketball World Cup players
2010 FIBA World Championship players
2006 FIBA World Championship players
2002 FIBA World Championship players
Goodwill Games medalists in basketball
Sportspeople from Buenos Aires Province
Competitors at the 2001 Goodwill Games
Pan American Games competitors for Argentina